The Association of Special Fares Agents, or ASFA, consists of airline consolidators, bucket shops and discount travel agents.

Aims
The main purpose of ASFA is the exchange of knowledge in regards to discounted airline tickets on the same air route offered in different markets.

Founding
After a preliminary meeting in Frankfurt, Germany in 1985, the first ever association of discount travel agents was formed in 1986 by a small group of German, Swiss, Dutch, Singaporean, Australian and English travel agents. 

The association was founded as ITA (International Travel Association) in Amsterdam by Ad Latjes, Koos Schouten, Folke von Knobloch, Rudi Weissmann, Daniel Staeger and other discount travel industry experts as a platform for discount travel specialists, consolidators and bucketshops from all over the world.

History
Because of disagreements between the founding members about territorial exclusivity at a meeting in Singapore in April 1987 the name was changed to ASFA. ASFA was to allow multiple agents per country, while ITA continued as a small cartel.

Ad Latjes, the famous Dutch travel entrepreneur broke away from ASFA in 1989 to establish ETN (European Travel Network).

The administrative office of ASFA moved in 1998 to Sofia, Bulgaria.

Activities
ASFA organises annual workshops around the world with the purpose of educating international travel agents in the art of creative ticketing and to exchange information about new trends in the airline ticketing industry. In addition ASFA enables its membership of independent travel agents to create a worldwide network.

ASFA does not bond or license agents. ASFA members are registered and bonded according to the laws of the countries and states that they are operating in.

Membership
 ASFA has 1608 members.

References

External links
ASFA.net, the Association of Special Fares Agents website
Koosschouten.com
Adlatjes.com
The Practical Nomad – Airline Ticket Consolidators and Bucket Shops FAQ, by Edward Hasbrouck
European Travel Network

Traveling business organizations